The Burkina Faso national football team (French:  Équipe de football du Burkina Faso), represents Burkina Faso in men's international football and is controlled by the Burkinabé Football Federation. They were known as the Upper Volta national football team until 1984, when Upper Volta became Burkina Faso. They finished fourth in the 1998 Africa Cup of Nations, when they hosted the tournament. Their best ever finish in the tournament was the 2013 edition, reaching the final.

History
Their first international match was played on April 13, 1960, in the Jeux de la Communauté in Madagascar and ended with a 5–4 victory against Gabon.

Africa Cup of Nations

The country made their first appearance in the Africa Cup of Nations in 1978, but it was not until 1996 that they returned to the biennial tournament. They subsequently qualified for five consecutive tournaments between 1996 and 2004, reaching the semi-finals under coach Philippe Troussier when the tournament was held on home soil in 1998.

Burkina Faso played in Group B of the 2010 Africa Cup of Nations alongside Ghana and Ivory Coast in a three-team group due to Togo's withdrawal. Although they drew their first match against Ivory Coast and needed just a draw against Ghana to progress, the Burkinabe lost 1–0 and failed to qualify for the knock-out stage of the tournament. Burkina Faso took part in the 2012 Africa Cup of Nations, losing all three of their matches and subsequently firing coach Paulo Duarte. Belgian coach Paul Put was announced as new coach in March 2012.
Burkina Faso finished first of their group, but lost to Nigeria in the final of 2013 Africa Cup of Nations.

They team would earn third place at the 2017 Africa Cup of Nations.

World Cup qualifying

Burkina Faso first entered the World Cup in the 1978 qualifying tournament, beating Mauritania in the preliminary round before losing 1–3 against Ivory Coast. They next entered World Cup qualifying in 1990, losing in the first round to Libya 2–3. Burkina Faso withdrew from the 1994 competition but returned in 1998, beating Mauritania again to make it to the final qualifying group stage, however they failed to obtain a single point, finishing bottom of their group. They beat Ethiopia in 2002 to again make it to the qualifying group stage, but did not advance, only winning one game against Malawi.

The team had a strong showing in the 2014 World Cup qualification campaign, reaching the final round of qualifying where it faced Algeria. It won 3–2 in Ouagadougou, but lost 1–0 in Blida. Despite the 3-3 aggregate, Burkina Faso narrowly missed out on the 2014 World Cup due to the away goals rule.

Nickname
The team is nicknamed Les Etalons, which means "The Stallions".  It is in reference to the legendary horse of Princess Yennenga. Supporters of the team at times include a percussion band, which often mimics the sounds of galloping horses at matches.

Recent schedule and results

The following is a list of match results from the previous twelve months, as well as any future matches that have been scheduled.

2021

2022

2023

Coaching history

 Otto Pfister (1976–1978)
 Heinz-Peter Überjahn (1988–1990)
 Idrissa Traoré (1992–1996)
 Calixte Zagre (1996)
 Ivan Vutov (1996–1997)
 Malik Jabir (1997)
 Philippe Troussier (1997–1998)
 Didier Notheaux (1998–1999)
 René Taelman (2000)
 Sidiki Diarra (2000–2001)
 Oscar Fulloné (2001–2002)
 Jacques Yaméogo &  Pihouri Weboanga (2002)
 Jean-Paul Rabier (2002–2004)
 Ivica Todorov (2004–2005)
 Bernard Simondi (2005–2006)
 Idrissa Traoré (2006–2007)
 Didier Notheaux &  Sidiki Diarra (2007)
 Paulo Jorge Rebelo Duarte (2008–2012)
 Paul Put (2012–2015)
 Gernot Rohr (2015)
 Paulo Jorge Rebelo Duarte (2015–2019)
 Kamou Malo (2019–2022)
 Hubert Velud (2022–present)

Players

Current squad
The following players were called up for the 2023 AFCON qualification matches against Togo on 24 and 28 March 2023.

Caps and goals correct as of: 19 November 2022, after the match against .

Recent call-ups
The following players have been called up for Burkina Faso in the last 12 months.

Notes
WD = Player withdrew from the squad due to non-injury issue.
INJ = Player withdrew from the squad due to an injury.
PRE = Preliminary squad.
RET = Player has retired from international football.
SUS = Suspended from the national team.

Records

Players in bold are still active with Burkina Faso.

Most appearances

Top goalscorers

Competition records

FIFA World Cup

Africa Cup of Nations

African Nations Championship

African Games

West African Nations Cup

WAFU Nations Cup

Notes

References

External links

L'actualité du Burkina
Burkina Faso at FIFA.com

African national association football teams
 
1960 establishments in Upper Volta